Boudouaou is a district in Boumerdès Province, Algeria. It was named after its capital, Boudouaou.

Municipalities
The district is further divided into 5 municipalities:
Boudouaou
Boudouaou-El-Bahri
Bouzegza Keddara
El Kharrouba
Ouled Hedadj

History

French conquest

 Expedition of the Col des Beni Aïcha (1837)
 First Battle of Boudouaou (1837)
 First Battle of the Issers (1837)
 Battle of Alma (1871)

Algerian Revolution

Salafist terrorism

 2006 Boudouaou bombing (8 August 2006)

Notable people

 Ahmed Mahsas, Algerian politician and writer
 Rachid Mimouni, Algerian writer
 Walid Derrardja, Algerian footballer

References

Districts of Boumerdès Province